Haggo is a surname. Notable people with the surname include:

Allan Haggo (born 1961), Scottish cricket umpire
David Haggo (born 1964), Scottish cricketer
Samantha Haggo (born 1992), Scottish cricketer

See also
Hägg